The Dark Star is a 1955 West German drama film directed by Hermann Kugelstadt and starring Elfie Fiegert, Ilse Steppat and Viktor Staal.

The film's sets were designed by the art director Heinrich Beisenherz.

It has never been screened on television in Germany.

Cast
 
 Elfie Fiegert as Moni
 Ilse Steppat as Frl. Rieger, die Lehrerin
 Viktor Staal as Casseno
 Paul Bildt as Dr. Schumann, Tierarzt
 Jürgen Micksch as Manuel
 Edith Schultze-Westrum as Frau Lechner
 Gert Fröbe as Deltorri
 Siegfried Breuer Jr. as Christian
 Alexander von Richthofen as Ulli
 Ingeborg Schöner as Linda
 Hansi Knoteck as Frau Casseno
 Maria Marietta as Anita
 Michael Gebühr as Fredy
 Knut Mahlke as Heinz
 Werner Stock
 Nicolas Koline
 Gustl Gstettenbaur as Micky
 Christl Heitlinger as Blanka
 Albert Florath as Ressel sen.
 Wolfgang Büttner as Bellani
 Charly Coleanos
 Anne-Marie Hanschke
 Martin Jente
 Herbert Jovy
 Gusti Kreissl
 Leo Siedler
 Petra Unkel
 Fritz Wepper

References

Bibliography 
 Hans-Michael Bock and Tim Bergfelder. The Concise Cinegraph: An Encyclopedia of German Cinema. Berghahn Books, 2009.

External links 
 

1955 films
1955 drama films
German drama films
West German films
1950s German-language films
Films directed by Hermann Kugelstadt
Circus films
German black-and-white films
1950s German films